Power Tracks is a 1993 album by 2 Unlimited, a Eurodance project founded in 1991 by Belgian producers Jean-Paul DeCoster and Phil Wilde and fronted by Dutch rapper Ray Slijngaard and Dutch vocalist Anita Doth.

Release history
Containing 11 tracks, the album was released to celebrate the visit of 2 Unlimited to Japan in 1994.

Track listing
 "No Limit" (Rio and Le Jean Remix) – 4:00
 "Get Ready For This" (800 Mix) – 5:28
 "The Magic Friend" (Rio and Le Jean Remix) – 5:16
 "R.U.O.K." - 4:14
 "Workaholic" (Hardcore Remix) - 4:16
 "Twilight Zone" (Rapping Rave Version) - 5:47
 "Tribal Dance" (Extended) – 5:14
 "Mysterious" - 4:26
 "Faces" (Trancs-Aumatic Remix) - 5:24
 "The Power Age" - 4:04
 "Juliana's Global Dance Network Mix" - 9:58
Get Ready for This, Workaholic and No Limit

Charts

 Japan: #62

References

2 Unlimited albums
1993 albums